Bruck-Mürzzuschlag is a district in Styria, Austria. It came into effect on January 1, 2013, when the merging of the districts Bruck an der Mur and Mürzzuschlag occurred. Just 2 years later, on 1 January 2015, the district was restructured in the Styria municipal structural reform and reduced from 37 to 19 towns. It consists of the following 19 municipalities:

Aflenz
Breitenau am Hochlantsch
Bruck an der Mur
Kapfenberg
 Kindberg
 Krieglach
 Langenwang
Mariazell
 Mürzzuschlag
 Neuberg an der Mürz
Pernegg an der Mur
 Sankt Barbara im Mürztal
 Sankt Lorenzen im Mürztal
 Sankt Marein im Mürztal
 Spital am Semmering
 Stanz im Mürztal
 Thörl
 Tragöß-Sankt Katharein
 Turnau

Prior district before 2015 
Up until 1 January 2015, the district contained the following 37 municipalities:

 Aflenz Kurort
 Aflenz Land
 Allerheiligen im Mürztal
 Altenberg an der Rax
 Breitenau am Hochlantsch
 Bruck an der Mur
 Etmißl 
 Frauenberg
 Ganz
 Gußwerk
 Halltal
 Kapellen
 Kapfenberg
 Kindberg
 Krieglach
 Langenwang
 Mariazell
 Mitterdorf im Mürztal
 Mürzhofen
 Mürzsteg
 Mürzzuschlag
 Neuberg an der Mürz
 Oberaich
 Parschlug
 Pernegg an der Mur
 Sankt Ilgen
 Sankt Katharein an der Laming
 Sankt Lorenzen im Mürztal
 Sankt Marein im Mürztal
 Sankt Sebastian
 Spital am Semmering
 Stanz im Mürztal
 Thörl
 Tragöß
 Turnau
 Veitsch
 Wartberg im Mürztal

References

 
Districts of Styria
States and territories established in 2013
2013 establishments in Austria